The European Long-Term Investors Association (ELTI) aisbl represent a European-wide network of National Promotional Banks and Institutions (NPBIs) . As of May 2020, the association gathers 31 European long-term financial institutions from 23 Member States across the European Union and Turkey.

Membership
The Full Members of ELTI are generally national official financial institutions . The European Investment Bank (EIB) has the status of a permanent observer. ELTI also includes Associate Members notably multilateral financial institutions, regional financial institutions and non-banking institutions.

As of May 2020, ELTI's 23 full members and 8 associate members include:

Full members
Austria:  Oesterreichische Kontrollbank Aktiengesellschaft (OeKB)
Belgium:  (SFPI/FPIM).
Bulgaria:  Bulgarian Development Bank (BDB)
Croatia: Croatian bank for reconstruction and Development (HBOR)
Czech Republic: Ceskomoravska zarucni a rozvojova banka (ČMZRB)
France: la Banque publique d’investissement (Bpifrance)
France: Caisse des dépôts et consignations (CDC)
Germany:  KfW Bankengruppe (KfW)
Greece:  National Bank of Greece (NBG)
Hungary:  Hungarian Development Bank (MFB)
Ireland:  Strategic Banking Corporation of Ireland (SBCI)
Italy:  Cassa Depositi e Prestiti (CDP)
Latvia: The Latvian Development Finance Institution (ALTUM) 
Lithuania: JSC Public Investment Development Agency (VIPA)
Luxembourg: Société Nationale de Crédit et d’Investissement (SNCI)
Malta:  Bank of Valletta (BOV)
Malta: Malta Development Bank (MDB)
Netherlands: Invest-NL 
Poland: Bank Gospodarstwa Krajowego (BGK)
Portugal: Instituição Financeira de Desenvolvimento, S.A.(IFD)
Slovakia: Slovak Investment Holding (SIH)
Slovenia: Slovenska izvozna in razvojna banka (SID)
Spain: Instituto de Crédito Oficial (ICO)

Associate Members
Bulgaria: Fund Manager of Financial Instruments in Bulgaria (FMFIB)
 Council of Europe Development Bank (CEB)
Germany: NRW.BANK
Greece: Consignment Deposits and Loans Fund (CDLF)
Lithuania: UAB Investicijų ir verslo garantijos (INVEGA)
Long-Term Infrastructure Investors Association (LTIIA)
 Nordic Investment Bank (NIB)
Turkey: Turkiye Sinai Kalkinma Bankasi A.S. (TSKB)

Permanent Observer
The  European Investment Bank (EIB)

References 

European investment banks
Organizations related to the European Union
International banking institutions
Finance in the European Union